"Special Girl" is a song written by Canadian singer-songwriter/guitarist Eddie Schwartz in collaboration with songwriter/producer and fellow Canadian David Tyson.  It has been a modest hit for Schwartz in Canada, for the band America in the US, and for Meat Loaf in the UK.

Charted versions

Eddie Schwartz version (1984)
"Special Girl" first appeared on Schwartz' 1984 album, Public Life, and was released as a single with an accompanying music video. It reached No. 20 on the Adult Contemporary charts in Canada.

Charts

America version (1984)
Later the same year, the band America recorded a version, releasing it as a single from their 1984 album Perspective.  This version cracked the top 20 on the Adult Contemporary chart in the United States, reaching No. 15.  It also reached No. 106 on the Billboard chart.

Charts

Meat Loaf version (1986)
The tune was also covered by Meat Loaf on his 1986 album, Blind Before I Stop.  Issued as a single in the UK on April 6, 1987, it reached No. 81 in the UK Singles Chart.

Charts

References

1983 songs
1984 singles
Songs written by Eddie Schwartz
Songs written by David Tyson
Eddie Schwartz songs
America (band) songs
Meat Loaf songs
Song recordings produced by Richie Zito
Capitol Records singles